Sheeep is a British children's animated television series that aired on CBBC in the United Kingdom and was produced by Grand Slamm Children's Films and HIT Entertainment. It is based on the book Sheep in Wolves' Clothing by Japanese author Satoshi Kitamura, the illustrator of Angry Arthur. It is one of the few HIT Entertainment shows to air on CBBC as an individual network after 2002, when CBBC and CBeebies became separate networks along with Collingwood O'Hare's Dennis the Menace. The show followed the adventures of three sheep called Georgina, Gogol, and Hubert who often end up thwarting the scheme of three wolves called Moze, Spike, and Gotcha (who are often accompanied by a friendly lollipop-loving wolf cub named Kid) or even when Moze's companions mess them up. The first 12 episodes of the show were dubbed for home media in Japan.

Characters

Main

Georgina (voiced by Julia Sawalha) - A female sheep who has a rather bossy, domineering personality. She sometimes appears to be the self-elected leader of the trio and is often too keen to put her opinions forward. Also, she mistrusts wolves more than anyone. She leads a flock of sheep in (fictional) "Green Meadow". Her full name is "Georgina Sheep". In the Japanese dub, she is called "Jun-Chan". She speaks with a London accent.
Gogol (voiced by Enn Reitel and originally/possibly Jimmy Hibbert at one point in "Hubert's Surprise" (Heard specifically, when he says "You take this end and I'll take the other.")) - The intellectual of the trio and seems to be the only main sheep who spends most of his time in the city. He drives a car (most likely based on a Beauford Open Tourer), owns a house and has a job as a photographer for the town's newspaper, The Daily Fleece. His full name is "Gogol Sheep". In the Japanese dub, he is called "Goro-Chan". He has minor appearances in "The Stamp" and "Housesitting". He speaks with a Lancashire accent.
Hubert (voiced by David Holt) - The quietest and most modest of the flock; he seldom speaks and lives in "Green Meadow" with his sister (as mentioned by Penny from "Georgina's Sleepover"), Georgina. His full name is "Hubert Sheep". In the Japanese dub, he is called "Hide-Chan". He speaks with a Yorkshire accent.

Villains

Moze (voiced by Enn Reitel) - The devious planner of bad schemes for the wolves' benefit. Wears a black-and-red-striped necktie and round sunglasses. His interests are stealing, money, and playing golf. He lives in an old shop (which was a wool shop in the original book) and drives a van (based heavily on a Bedford CF2 and a Ford Transit Mark II) (In the original book, Moze drove a green saloon car with a number plate saying WOLF 1 (based on a Saab 93), which possibly might have belonged to the waistcoat wearing wolf from the book, meaning he took it with him when Kid started living with Moze, Spike, and Gotcha). His full name is "Moze Wolfgang". In the Japanese dub, he is called "Mods". He speaks with an American accent. It is possible that he is referred to by name in the original book.
Spike (voiced by David Holt) - One of Moze's sidekicks. He wears a green bow tie and rectangular sunglasses. His eyes are also tiny black dots, but are drawn big in the original book (shown when the trio, Uncle Elliott, and the quartet of cats enter Moze's shop). He speaks with a Brooklyn accent. It is unknown if he is referred to by name in the original book.
Gotcha (voiced by David Holt and possibly Enn Reitel at one point in "Queen Georgina") - Moze's other sidekick who wears a blue bandana. He is more dim-witted compared to Spike. He speaks with a Brooklyn accent. It is unknown if he is referred to by name in the original book.

Recurring

Kid (additional noises by Julia Sawalha) - Gotcha's little sister (according to the back covers of the Australian VHSs and DVDs by Magna Pacific and HIT Entertainment). She says nothing, she just always licks a lollipop and doesn't at all involve herself in the wolves' schemes. Kid wears a green-and-blue-striped skirt and hair bow. In the original book, her position is used by an older wolf wearing a green waistcoat. In the Japanese dub, she is called "Chibi". She does not appear in "Tango Tangle" and has minor appearances in "The Stamp", "Stormy Weather", "Scoop", and "The Talent Contest". A picture of her when she was younger (shown wearing a striped jumper) can be seen on the wall of Moze's shop.
Mrs Wolfgang (voiced by Enn Reitel) - Moze's mother, who was seen in "Housesitting" and "Georgina's Sleepover". A picture of her can be seen on the wall of Moze's shop, albeit in two pieces.
Captain Bleat (voiced by David Holt) - Hubert's Sailor friend, who lives on a boat and enjoys telling stories about his past. He speaks with a West Country accent.
Uncle Elliott (voiced by Enn Reitel) - Hubert and Georgina's uncle (who was their cousin in the original book) who works at an office, collecting stamps and working on The Daily Fleece. His office is located near Moze's shop. In the book, his full name is "Elliott Baa". One of his most notable appearances is near the end of the intro, where he is seen at his desk looking at a picture of Moze. He is mentioned in "Say Cheese" (The first episode in production order) and "Scoop" (both lines where he is mentioned were said by Gogol). He speaks with an American accent.
P. C. Butt (voiced by David Holt) - A police officer who investigates the wolves' crimes and, at times, can be oblivious of various situations. He is mentioned in "The Big Freeze" and "Georgina's Sleepover" (Both lines where he is mentioned were said by Georgina). He speaks with a Bristolian accent. It is unclear whether or not if he appeared in the original book.
White Dog (voiced by David Holt) - An unnamed White Dog who runs various events. He speaks with a Yorkshire accent.
Edna (voiced by Julia Sawalha) - A Cow who lives at Green Meadow with Hubert and Georgina and dances with other Cows. According to Hubert in "Hubert's Surprise", her full name is "Edna Cow". Her first name is revealed in "Umbrella Racing", an old flash game on HIT's website based loosely on "The Flood". She can switch between mooing and speaking in a posh English accent.
Hubert and Georgina's Flock - The other sheep who live at Green Meadow with Hubert and Georgina.
Dancing Cows (voiced by Julia Sawalha) - The other cows that Edna dances with, who were seen in "Scoop" and "The Talent Contest".

One-off

The Horse - A horse who lives at Green Meadow with Hubert, Georgina, and Edna the cow. Seen in "The Flat Tyre".
Jaunita Luftfita (voiced by Julia Sawalha) - A ballroom dancer, that Gogol has a crush on. She drives a pink cabriolet coupe (based on a Triumph Herald) and speaks with a Russian accent. Seen in "Tango Tangle" and on a poster in Moze's shop in "Stormy Weather".
Other Wolves - A bunch of wolves, who came to see Gogol and Georgina play music, only for Hubert and Captain Bleat to interrupt the concert with a fake thunderstorm. Seen in "Stormy Weather".
Penny (voiced by Julia Sawalha) - Georgina's girly cousin (although not mentioned as such), who gave her a makeover at a clothing shop and was ignorant when Moze stole her normal outfit to give to his mother, thinking the bag it was in contained a hat Penny decided not to buy earlier. She drives a blue cabriolet coupe (based on an Alfa Romeo Giulietta Spider). She is never seen interacting with Hubert or Gogol and her house is shown on screen as just her bedroom. She speaks with a Bristolian accent. Seen in "Georgina's Sleepover".
Duncan Shears (voiced by David Holt) - An announcer who worked at a talent contest the trio took part in and speaks with a Tennessee accent. His outfit loosely resembles the zoot suit Gogol wore in "Stormy Weather", but with a darker colour. Seen in "The Talent Contest".
Princess Grazelightly (voiced by Julia Sawalha) - a celebrity who befriended Georgina after her coat accidentally got turned pink at the laundrette. She travels in a limousine and speaks with a Hollywood accent. Seen in "Georgina and the Princess".

Episodes

Unaired Pilot (1998)

Season 1 (2000)

Season 2 (2001)

Trivia
In the unaired pilot episode, Georgina is depicted with more eyelashes, similar to how she was drawn in the original book.
The front cover of the original book appears as a poster in Nicholas' room in one of Satoshi Kitamura's other books, Me and My Cat?.
Magna Pacific, who worked with HIT to release the Australian VHSs and DVDs of the show also released the Australian home media releases for various other HIT Entertainment shows that weren't released by the Australian Broadcasting Corporation.
Some merchandise of the show (notably the four Japanese VHSs and DVDs) has a tagline saying "Based on the books by Satoshi Kitamura", despite Sheep in Wolves' Clothing being one book.
It is obvious that Wallace and Gromit was one of the influences for the original book and the show, due to the comedic and action heavy humour.
Despite the show mostly having the 1995-2001 HIT Entertainment logo, the 2001-2007 logo has appeared on "The Flat Tyre" on Children's Favourites Bumper Special and on "Sheeep Showers", "Housesitting", and "Treasure Treats" on Volume 2 (Released in Australia).

Home Video Releases

UK

Children's Favourites 2 (2001) (HIT Entertainment) (VHS) - Hubert's Surprise
Hubert's Surprise and Other Stories (2001) (HIT Entertainment) (VHS) - 1. Hubert's Surprise 2. Gogol's Sofa 3. Queen Georgina 4. Say Cheese (?) 5. Gogol the Champion (?) 6. Gogol Learns Golf (?) (NOTE: It is currently unknown if this VHS was released since most pictures that have surfaced online are of a high quality scan of the front cover)
Children's Favourites 3 (2001) (HIT Entertainment) (VHS) - Gogol Learns Golf
Children's Favourites Bumper Special (2003) (HIT Entertainment) (VHS/DVD) - The Flat Tyre
Superstar Children's Favourites (2004) (HIT Entertainment) (VHS/DVD) - The Talent Contest

Japan

Volume 1 (Hide-Chan's Birthday) (2001) (Sony Music Entertainment and HIT Entertainment) (VHS/DVD) - 1. Hubert's Surprise 2. Gogol's Sofa 3. Queen Georgina
Volume 2 (Gate Jumping Tournament) (2001) (Sony Music Entertainment and HIT Entertainment) (VHS/DVD) - 1. Say Cheese 2. Gogol the Champion 3. Gogol Learns Golf
Volume 3 (Chasing a Lost Car) (2001) (Sony Music Entertainment and HIT Entertainment) (VHS/DVD) - 1. The Stamp 2.The Flat Tyre 3. Stuck in the Mud
Volume 4 (Beware the Beach Shower) (2001) (Sony Music Entertainment and HIT Entertainment) (VHS/DVD) - 1. Sheeep Showers 2. Tango Tangle 3. Housesitting

Australia

Volume 1 (2004) (Magna Pacific and HIT Entertainment) (VHS/DVD) - 1. Say Cheese 2. Queen Georgina 3. The Stamp 4. Gogol the Champion 5. Hubert's Surprise 6. Gogol's Sofa 7. The Flat Tyre 8. Gogol Learns Golf
Volume 2 (2004) (Magna Pacific and HIT Entertainment) (VHS/DVD) - 1. Stuck in the Mud 2. Sheep Showers 3. Tango Tangle 4. Housesitting 5. Treasure Treats 6. The Big Freeze 7. Stormy Weather 8. Scoop (NOTE: A screenshot from the partially found episode, Hubert Goes Green can be seen inside the cover underneath the episode listing)
Volume 3 (2004) (Magna Pacific and HIT Entertainment) (VHS/DVD) - 1. Georgina's Sleepover 2. Say it with Flowers 3. The Bank Robbery 4. The Flood 5. The Talent Contest 6. Keep Fit 7. Sea Tales 8. Georgina and the Princess 9. Snow Business (NOTE: The partially found episode, Hubert Goes Green is left out for unknown reasons)

South Africa

Hubert's Surprise and Other Stories (2006) (HIT Entertainment (?)) (DVD) - 1. Hubert's Surprise 2. Gogol's Sofa 3. Queen Georgina 4. Say Cheese 5. Gogol the Champion
Playing Around (2006) (HIT Entertainment (?)) (DVD) - 1. Gogol Learns Golf 2. The Stamp 3. The Flat Tyre 4. Stuck in the Mud 5. Sheeep Showers
Tango Tangle and Other Stories (2006) (HIT Entertainment (?)) (DVD) - 1. Tango Tangle 2. Housesitting (?) 3. Treasure Treats (?) 4. The Big Freeze (?) 5. Stormy Weather (?)

Norway

Sheeep 1 (2007) (Scanbox and HIT Entertainment (?)) (DVD) - 1. Say Cheese 2. Queen Georgina 3. The Stamp 4. Gogol the Champion 5. Hubert's Surprise 6. Gogol's Sofa
Sheeep 2 (2007) (Scanbox and HIT Entertainment (?)) (DVD) - 1. The Flat Tyre 2. Gogol Learns Golf 3. Stuck in the Mud 4. Sheeep Showers 5. Tango Tangle 6. Housesitting 7. Treasure Treats

References

External links
Official Website (NOTE: Does not work, due to the closure of Adobe Flash Player in 2020)
Information about the show on Grand Slamm Children's Films' website (NOTE: Spike and Gotcha's names are switched)

2000 British television series debuts
2001 British television series endings
2000s British animated television series
British children's animated adventure television series
British children's animated fantasy television series
BBC children's television shows
Television series by Mattel Creations
Television series about sheep
English-language television shows
Australian Broadcasting Corporation original programming